The Partita No. 3 in E major for solo violin, BWV 1006.1 (formerly 1006), is the last work in Johann Sebastian Bach's set of Sonatas and Partitas. It consists of the following movements:
 Preludio
 Loure
 Gavotte en Rondeau
 Menuets (I and II)
 Bourrée
 Gigue

It takes about 15–18 minutes to perform.

Bach transcribed the Partita as a suite, cataloged as BWV 1006.2 (formerly 1006a). The music critic Wilhelm Tappert claimed in 1900 that this arrangement was for lute solo, but present research indicates that it was for an unspecified instrument.

The Preludio consists almost entirely of semiquavers (i.e. sixteenth notes). The Preludio was also transcribed by Bach for use in two cantatas:
 the sinfonia which opens the second part of the 1729 cantata .
 the opening sinfonia, scored for obbligato organ, oboes, trumpets and strings, of the 1731 cantata , in D major

The "Gavotte en Rondeau" is included on the Voyager Golden Record and often heard in TV or radio programs.

In 1933 Sergei Rachmaninoff transcribed for piano (and subsequently recorded) the Preludio, Gavotte, and Giga from this partita (as TN 111/1). An arrangement of the Preludio for jazz trio by Jacques Loussier appeared on his Reflections of Bach album of 1987 and was used as the theme of the BBC Radio 4 music quiz show Counterpoint.

References

External links 

 Manuscript (fair copy) in Bach's hand of the Partita at the Bach Digital project
 
  
 Performance by violinist Karen Gomyo from the Isabella Stewart Gardner Museum in MP3 format
 , Arthur Grumiaux

Bach3
Suites by Johann Sebastian Bach
Compositions in E major
Contents of the Voyager Golden Record